José Gregorio Neira Carvajal (born January 13, 1939) is a retired track and field athlete from Colombia. He competed in the middle-distances, and represented his native country at the 1964 Summer Olympics in Tokyo, Japan.

References
sports-reference

1939 births
Living people
Colombian male middle-distance runners
Athletes (track and field) at the 1964 Summer Olympics
Olympic athletes of Colombia
Central American and Caribbean Games bronze medalists for Colombia
Competitors at the 1962 Central American and Caribbean Games
Athletes (track and field) at the 1971 Pan American Games
Central American and Caribbean Games medalists in athletics
Pan American Games competitors for Colombia
20th-century Colombian people